Ido Levy (born 31 July 1990) is an Israeli professional footballer who plays as a centre-back for Hapoel Hadera.

Career statistics

Honours
Liga Leumit
Winner (1): 2013–14
Israel State Cup
Runner-up (1): 2013–14

References

1990 births
Living people
Association football defenders
Israeli footballers
Maccabi Netanya F.C. players
Hapoel Herzliya F.C. players
Hapoel Ra'anana A.F.C. players
Hapoel Haifa F.C. players
Hapoel Hadera F.C. players
Israeli Premier League players
Liga Leumit players
Footballers from Hadera
Israel under-21 international footballers